Shahid Syed Nazrul Islam Medical College is a government medical school in Bangladesh, established in 2011. It is located at Kishoreganj. The college is affiliated with University of Dhaka as a constituent college.

It offers 5 years MBBS degree programme and admits about 65 students every year.

History
Shahid Syed Nazrul Islam Medical College was established in 2011. It was named after Syed Nazrul Islam, the first acting President of Bangladesh.

In the year 2010–2011, Bangladesh government approved a measure to establish 4 medical colleges at Jessore, Satkhira, Kishoreganj and Kushtia with a view to improve the healthcare services in the country. The Executive Committee of the National Economic Council (ECNEC) endorsed the project. An estimated cost of Tk 5.45 billion was approved as budget to establish Shahid Syed Nazrul Islam Medical College. The project included construction of six storied hospital building, five storied college for academic building, nurses training center, students hostel, internee doctors' hostel, doctors' dormitory, staff nurses' dormitory, mosque, auditorium, principal and directors' residential buildings, installation of gymnasium, procurement of equipment, one micro-bus, two ambulances and furniture with the fund.

See also
 Gurudayal Government College
 List of medical colleges in Bangladesh
 Pakundia Adarsha Mohila College

References

Medical colleges in Bangladesh
Hospitals in Bangladesh
Educational institutions established in 2011
2011 establishments in Bangladesh
Colleges in Kishoreganj District